The Qaf-Perollaj mine is a large mine located near the village Zogaj in northern Albania in Kukës County,  north-east of the capital, Tirana. Qaf-Perollaj represents one of the largest chromium reserve in Albania and one of the largest in Europe having estimated reserves of 0.433 million tonnes of ore grading between 30 and 34% chromium metal.

The Qaf-Perollaj mine began operating in 1989. The total combined chromium ore production from the mine between 1989 and 2006 amounted to 40,000 tonnes. The chromium ore reserves of the mine are split into two categories above and below Profile 16. The proven ore reserves located above the Level +565 amount to 433,000 tonnes of ore grading between 30 and 34% chromium metal. The proven ore reserves located below the Level +565 are currently not estimated or calculated but are expected to be grading 40% chromium metal. The mine's total reserves amount to 0.433 million tonnes of ore grading between 30 and 34% chromium metal. The mine has been privatised in 2004.

References 

Chromium mines in Albania
Underground mines in Albania
Tropojë